Hariharpur, Nepal may refer to:

Hariharpur, Bheri
Hariharpur, Janakpur
Hariharpur, Kapilvastu
Hariharpur,  Narayani
Hariharpur, Parsa
Hariharpur, Sagarmatha